LNL or LnL may refer to:

 Late Night Live, Australian radio program
 Liberty National Life Insurance Company, US
 Longnan Chengzhou Airport, IATA code
 Laboratori Nazionali di Legnaro, Italian physics institute
 Luke and Laura, fictional characters from the soap opera General Hospital

See also
Lock N' Load (disambiguation)